Robert House Peters Sr. (12 March 1880 – 7 December 1967) was a British-born American silent film actor, known to filmgoers of the era as "The Star of a Thousand Emotions".

Biography
Born in Bristol, Gloucestershire, England, Peters began his career on a high note, playing the handsome leading man in In the Bishop's Carriage (1913), co-starring Mary Pickford. While The Bishop's Carriage was filmed in an East Coast studio, Peters was in Los Angeles by 1914, becoming one of the first screen stars to permanently settle there. Although he stated publicly that he preferred playing villains, Peters, curly haired and pleasantly dimpled, was from the outset typecast as the romantic hero.

After enjoying his greatest success as the good-bad hero of The Girl of the Golden West (1915), Peters found his career at the peak of the early 1920s. He signed with Universal Studios for six films in 1924, hoping for a comeback. The results, however, were mostly mediocre and he was soon demoted to supporting roles. Retired after 1928's Rose Marie, Peters returned for a guest appearance in The Old West, a 1952 Gene Autry film that also featured his son, House Peters Jr., who subsequently enjoyed a lengthy film career portraying villains as well as Procter and Gamble's Mr. Clean character in cleaning product commercials from the late 1950s into the '60s.

Personal life
Peters was married to actress Mae King in 1914 with whom he had three children, Gregg, Patricia and Robert Jr., who subsequently used the stage name House Peters Jr. Peters was 87 when he died of pneumonia at the Motion Picture Country House and Hospital in Woodland Hills, California.

Filmography

References

External links

1880 births
1967 deaths
Burials at Forest Lawn Memorial Park (Glendale)
Deaths from pneumonia in California
English male film actors
English male silent film actors
British emigrants to the United States
20th-century English male actors